Aleosan, officially the Municipality of Aleosan (Maguindanaon: Inged nu Aleosan, Jawi: ايڠايد نو الاوسن; Iranun: Inged a Aleosan, ايڠايد ا الاوسن; ;), is a 3rd class municipality in the province of Cotabato, Philippines. According to the 2020 census, it has a population of 36,892 people.

History
The name Aleosan is an acronym derived from the three (3) towns of Iloilo where majority of the early Christian settlers came from; A is for Alimodian, LEO is for Leon, and SAN for San Miguel.

Parliamentary bill no. 670 authored by Assemblyman Jesus P. Amparo and co-authored by assemblymen Blah T. Sinsuat, Ernesto F. Roldan and Tomas B. Baga Jr. sought to establish and create the Municipality of Aleosan in the Province of Cotabato, which was ultimately approved and signed into law Batas Pambansa bilang 206 on April 6, 1982. For purposes of ratification, Proclamation No. 2188 was signed by President Ferdinand E. Marcos on April 29, 1982. A plebiscite was conducted on May 7, 1982, which was unanimously confirmed the desire and aspiration of the people in the nineteen (19) barangays to become a distinct and regular municipality from Pikit its mother municipality.

Geography
Aleosan is within the political boundary of Cotabato Province. It is bounded on the west by Midsayap; on the north by Libungan and on the east and south by Pikit. It is accessible to land transportation from Cotabato City traversing the municipalities of Maguindanao to Kidapawan up to Davao City, as it is located along the major transport route linking the provinces of Maguindanao, Cotabato and Davao del Sur.

Barangays
Aleosan is politically subdivided into 19 barangays. The seat of the municipal government is in barangay San Mateo.

Note

Climate

Aleosan area belongs to the fourth type of climate or the intermediate "E" with no distinct dry season. Rainfall is evenly distributed throughout the year with heavier rains from May to September. This type of climate conditions is suitable for the production of crops like rice, corn, mangoes, jackfruit, vegetables and root crops, which are considered seasonal crops and permanent crops like coconut, rubber, coffee, cacao and orchard crops.

Demographics

Economy

The municipality is endowed with abundant agricultural raw materials suitable for processing. These include coconut, banana, rubber, mango and coffee. There are small-scale enterprises but these are not sustainable due to inadequate capital. A cassava processing plant was shut down due to insufficient supply of raw materials and low quality of starch produced. The area however, is best suited for mango production and there is a need to develop the industry to cater the growing needs of the locality. The municipality's livestock industry has great potentials being one of the top producers and supplier of livestock in the province.

Tourism
 Brgy Malapang – Mountain climbing
 Brgy Pentil – Eco tourism
 Brgy Katalicanan – UK Peak

References

External links
 Aleosan Profile at the DTI Cities and Municipalities Competitive Index
 [ Philippine Standard Geographic Code]

Municipalities of Cotabato